Jackson Pines is an American folk rock band from New Jersey.

History
Jackson Pines is an indie folk duo from Jackson, New Jersey, consisting of Joe Makoviecki and James Black. Both members were previously playing together, since 2011, in the group Thomas Wesley Stern. Their debut EP, entitled NY-23A, contains an original song and a few covers, and it was recorded using one microphone, in a farmhouse in Palenville, New York. A review from Speak Into My Good Eye calls the EP a "beautiful collection of songs [that] establishes Jackson Pines' warm, natural aesthetic with Makoviecki's voice echoing and honoring the great songwriters. Their first album Purgatory Road released in 2017. The title track tells the story a woman having her first child, and a preacher scared the world is going to end, with Makoviecki explaining in The Aquarian Weekly that "I don't write any songs that don't have at least one foot in my real experience." Billboard calls the album a "mash-up of James Taylor and Tom Petty -- with serious focus on acoustic guitar."

Jackson Pines released the EPs Lost & Found in 2017. Gas Stations Blues & Diamond Rings released in 2019, and Bob Makin in New Jersey Stage says the duo "prove themselves to be one of New Jersey's best examples of those kinds of sounds and stories [of] American roots music." That year, they were featured on PBS program State of the Arts.

Members
James Black
Joe Makoviecki

Discography
Albums
Purgatory Road (2017)

EPs
 NY-23A (2016)
Lost & Found (2017)
Gas Stations Blues & Diamond Rings (2019)

References
Citations

Bibliography

External links

American musical duos
Indie rock musical groups from New Jersey